"Nuestro Amor" (English: "Our Love") is the first single from the Mexican pop group RBD's second studio album of the same name (2005). The song was also used to promote the second season of the soap opera Rebelde. Also, an English version of the song was recorded in 2006. "This Is Love", the English version of "Nuestro Amor", appears on RBD's 2006 first English studio album, Rebels (2006). In 2021, Moderatto invited Anahí to record a new version of this song, a rock version, released in December of the same year.

Its Portuguese version is called "Nosso Amor" and was released as a single in Brazil. A special music video for this version of the song was planned, but was scrapped.

Music video

The music video for the song was filmed in early August 2005 at Pedregal, Distrito Federal in México and was directed by Amin Azali. It was their first video directed by Amin Azali and premiered in September in the United States and Mexico.

The video is about a "date" the girls and boys of RBD have. This video starts with a phone call between Dulce Maria and Christopher, with Dulce being in bath and Christopher at the window. Then the girls dress up elegantly for the coming night they are about to have. The video features the male members getting ready for a romantic dinner too in a Japanese look-alike house, where the guys look for the girls as they leave clues for them in order to find the girls. Finally, the band walk outside and sit around, sing, enjoy the moonlight and oddly, share some bottles of milk from which they drink.

Chart performance

The song became RBD's fifth major hit in Mexico. The song peaked at number two on Billboard Hot Latin Pop Airplay chart and number six on Billboard's Top 50 Latin Tracks and Latin Tropical Airplay chart. The song also peaked at number 33 in week 10 on the Romanian Airplay Chart.

Release history

Charts

References

2005 singles
RBD songs
Spanish-language songs
Pop ballads
Articles containing video clips
2005 songs